Corinne Cole (born Corinne Elaine Kegley; April 13, 1937, Brentwood, California) is an American model and actress. She was briefly known as Lari Laine early in her career.

Biography
Cole was born and raised in Brentwood, California, the daughter of Alice Polk Kegley, a descendant of President James Knox Polk and former Ziegfeld Girl, and Carl S. Kegley, a criminal-trial attorney. She studied journalism at the University of California at Berkeley. She was Playboy magazine's Playmate of the Month for the May 1958 issue, with her centerfold photographed by Ron Vogel.  According to The Playmate Book, Corrine Cole used a pseudonym for her Playboy appearance because her father was considering running for Congress and she didn't want to disrupt those plans.

In 1968, Cole married her first husband, Sands Hotel boss Jack Entratter; they divorced a few years later. In 1972, she married Roger Heffron; they had a child and divorced in 1980. In 1990, she married her third husband, director George Sidney, with whom she worked on the 1966 film The Swinger. He died in 2002 after 12 years of marriage to Cole.

Filmography

Films
 The Lucifer Complex (1978)
 The Limit (1972) .... Judy
 The Party (1968) .... Janice Kane
 Who's Minding the Mint? (1967) .... Doris Miller
 Murderers' Row (1966) .... Miss January 
 The Swinger (1966) .... Sir Hubert's Secretary 
 The Murder Men (1961) (as Lari Laine)
 Arson for Hire (1959) (as Lari Laine) .... Cindy, the secretary

Television
 Cannon - "Memo from a Dead Man" (1973) .... Sigurd
 Ironside - "Side Pocket" (1968) .... Judy
 The F.B.I. - "Region of Peril" (1968) .... Linda Soames
 The Monkees - "Wild Monkees" (1967) .... Queenie
 The Adventures of Ozzie & Harriet - "A Wife in the Office" (1964) .... Miss Logan
 Hazel - "Barney Hatfield, Where Are You?" (1962) … Boo-Boo Bedoux
 Bachelor Father -  "Bentley and the Beauty Contest" (1959) … Miss Saskatchewan
 Peter Gunn - "The Ugly Frame" (1959) ... uncredited
 You Bet Your Life -  #58-08, Nov 13, 1958  ....  Lari Lane

See also
 List of people in Playboy 1953–1959

References

External links
 
 

Female models from California
1937 births
Living people
1950s Playboy Playmates
People from Brentwood, California
21st-century American women